National Route 381 is a national highway of Japan connecting Susaki, Kōchi and Uwajima, Ehime on the island of Shikoku, with a total length of 115.6 km (71.83 mi).

References

National highways in Japan
Roads in Ehime Prefecture
Roads in Kōchi Prefecture